The Communauté de communes du Pays Hamois is a former communauté de communes in the Somme département and in the Picardie région of France. It was created in October 1960. It was merged into the new Communauté de communes de l'Est de la Somme in January 2017.

Composition 
This Communauté de communes comprised 18 communes:

Athies
Brouchy
Croix-Moligneaux
Douilly
Ennemain
Eppeville
Esmery-Hallon
Ham
Matigny
Monchy-Lagache
Muille-Villette
Offoy
Pithon
Quivières
Sancourt
Tertry
Ugny-l'Équipée
Y

See also 
Communes of the Somme department

References 

Pays Hamois